Hu Wenrong (born July 1964) is a Chinese politician currently serving as head of the Organization Department of the Shanghai Municipal Committee of the Chinese Communist Party.

He was an alternate member of the 19th Central Committee of the Chinese Communist Party and is an alternate member of the 20th Central Committee of the Chinese Communist Party. He was a representative of the 20th National Congress of the Chinese Communist Party.

Biography
Hu was born in Putian County (now Putian), Fujian, in July 1964, and graduated from Tongji University.

Hu successively worked at Shandong University of Science and Technology, Shandong University of Technology (now Shandong University), and Shandong University. He joined the Chinese Communist Party (CCP) in May 1990.

Hu got involved in politics in December 2004, when he became an official of the Organization Department of the CCP Shandong Provincial Committee. He moved up the ranks to become deputy head in February 2009 and executive deputy head in March 2013. He also served as deputy party secretary of the State owned Assets Supervision and Administration Commission of Shandong from October 2011 to July 2014. He was appointed secretary-general of the CCP Shandong Provincial Committee in June 2017 and was admitted to member of the Standing Committee of the CCP Shandong Provincial Committee, the province's top authority.

In September 2017, he was transferred to southwest China's Chongqing city, where he was a member of the Standing Committee of the CCP Chongqing Municipal Committee and head of the Organization Department.

In December 2020, he was assigned to the similar position in east China's Shanghai city.

He is selected as the Chairman of the Shanghai Committee of the Chinese People's Political Consultative Conference in January 2023.

References

1964 births
Living people
People from Putian
Tongji University alumni
Academic staff of Shandong University of Science and Technology
Academic staff of Shandong University
People's Republic of China politicians from Fujian
Chinese Communist Party politicians from Fujian
Alternate members of the 19th Central Committee of the Chinese Communist Party
Alternate members of the 20th Central Committee of the Chinese Communist Party